Daniele Tinchella (born 14 August 1952) is a retired Italian racing cyclist. He won stage 22 of the 1976 Giro d'Italia.

References

External links
 

1952 births
Living people
Italian male cyclists
Italian Giro d'Italia stage winners
Place of birth missing (living people)
People from Prato
Sportspeople from the Province of Prato
Cyclists from Tuscany